Metabasis is a genus of flies in the family Stratiomyidae.

Species
Metabasis rostratus Walker, 1851

References

Stratiomyidae
Brachycera genera
Monotypic Brachycera genera
Taxa named by Francis Walker (entomologist)
Diptera of South America